Eagleville is a city in Rutherford County, Tennessee. The population was 604 at the 2010 census.

History
Eagleville was founded in 1832, and was originally named "Manchester."  When a post office opened in 1836, the city changed its name to "Eagleville," since the name Manchester was already taken.  According to local lore, the name was inspired by an unusually large eagle killed in the vicinity.  Eagleville was part of Williamson County until 1877, when it agreed to join Rutherford after Williamson County refused to build a road connecting Eagleville with Franklin, the county seat. In 2015, Eagleville completed its sewer system. The $3.1 million project was financed by a low-interest loan and a grant from the United States Department of Agriculture (USDA).

Geography
Eagleville is located at 35.7417° N, 86.6497° W

Demographics

As of the census of 2000, there were 464 people, 187 households, and 134 families residing in the city. The population density was 218.1 people per square mile (84.1/km2). There were 198 housing units at an average density of 93.1 per square mile (35.9/km2). The racial makeup of the city was 97.84% White, 1.29% African American, 0.43% Native American, and 0.43% from two or more races. Hispanic or Latino of any race were 0.86% of the population.

There were 187 households, out of which 29.4% had children under the age of 18 living with them, 57.2% were married couples living together, 8.6% had a female householder with no husband present, and 28.3% were non-families. 24.6% of all households were made up of individuals, and 13.4% had someone living alone who was 65 years of age or older. The average household size was 2.48 and the average family size was 2.94.

In the city, the population was spread out, with 24.1% under the age of 18, 9.7% from 18 to 24, 28.0% from 25 to 44, 24.1% from 45 to 64, and 14.0% who were 65 years of age or older. The median age was 39 years. For every 100 females, there were 92.5 males. For every 100 females age 18 and over, there were 93.4 males.

The median income for a household in the city was $47,500, and the median income for a family was $63,542. Males had a median income of $36,250 versus $25,000 for females. The per capita income for the city was $21,915. About 5.3% of families and 4.3% of the population were below the poverty line, including 1.0% of those under age 18 and 4.3% of those age 65 or over.

References

External links
Official site
City charter

Cities in Tennessee
Cities in Rutherford County, Tennessee
Cities in Nashville metropolitan area
1832 establishments in Tennessee
Populated places established in 1832